The Waikato Charity Classic was a golf tournament held in New Zealand in 1976. The event was played on the Lochiel course near Hamilton, New Zealand. John Lister won the event by 7 strokes.

Winners

References

Golf tournaments in New Zealand